TUGboat (DOI prefix 10.47397) is a journal published three times per year by the TeX Users Group.  It covers a wide range of topics in digital typography relevant to the TeX typesetting system.  The editor is Barbara Beeton.

See also
The PracTeX Journal

External links
TUGboat home page
List of TeX-related publications and journals

TeX
Typesetting
Publications established in 1980
Computer science journals